Paramakudi or Paramagudi is the largest town in the district of Ramanathapuram in Tamil Nadu, with a population of over 95,579 (2011 census).

It has been the taluk headquarters since 1918, i.e. from the date of formation of Ramanathapuram District. Paramakudi consists of two separate settlements, Paramakudi and Emaneswaran from the first half of this century. These settlements were classified as separate towns in the census records from 1901 to 1961 and then merged together to form the present municipal town in 1964.

The area of the town is 13.45 km2. The strength of the council is 36.

The river Vaigai flows through Paramakudi on its way to the Bay of Bengal.

History 

Paramakudi area was ruled by the Pandyan dynasty and later by  Sethupathi of Ramanathapuram. According to the ancient epic Ramayana, Lord Rama started his battle against Ravana at Sethu Canal, 45 minutes away.

In the late 12th and early 13th century, this province was ruled by Hazrat Sulthan Syed Ibrahim Shaheed of Ervadi. His heirs continued to rule following a peace treaty with the Sethupathis. Until the early 15th century the present territories of Ramanathapuram were included in the Pandyan Empire except for a short period under the Chola Dynasty, when Rajendra Chola I took it in 1063 AD.

In 1520 CE, the Nayaks of the Vijayanagara Empire took the area and reigned till the 17th century. At the beginning of the 18th century, family disputes over succession resulted in the division of Ramanathapuram. With the help of the king of Thanjavur in 1730 CE, one chieftain deposed the Sethupathi and became raja of Sivaganga. Seeing the weakness of the Nayak, the local chieftains (Palayakarars) became independent; including the raja of Sivagangai and the Sethupathi of Ramanathapuram. In 1730, Chanda Shahib of Karnataka captured Ramanathapuram. In 1741 it came under the control of the Maratha Empire and then the Nizam in 1744 CE. The chieftains revolted against the Nawab in 1752. By then, the throne of Karnataka had two rival pretenders, Chanda Shahib and Muhammed Ali, and this district was part of Karnataka. 

In 1795, the British deposed Muthuramalinga Sethupathi and took  over the administration of Ramanathapuram. In 1801 they made Mangaleswari Nachiyar zamindar of Sivaganga. After the Velu Nachiyar died, the Maruthu brothers took charge and made regular payments to the East India Company. In 1803 the Maruthu Pandiyar of Sivaganga revolted against the British in collaboration with 
 Kattabomman of Panchalamkurichi. Colonel Agnew captured and hanged the Maruthu brothers and made Gowri Vallabha Periya Udaya Thevar zamindar of Sivaganga. After the fall of Tippu Sultan, the British took control and imprisoned the Nawab. In 1892 they abolished the zamindari system and appointed a British collector.

In 1910, Paramakudi was formed from portions of Madurai and Tirunelveli districts, with J.F. Bryant as the first collector. During the British period this district was called “Ramnad” and the name remained after Independence. The district was renamed "Ramanathapuram" to conform with the Tamil name of the region. Paramakudi is also called Parambai, after the Vaigai river, which runs through the town: it means "face of the Vaigai".

Travel 

Air

The nearest airport is at Madurai, about 80 kms from Paramakudi.

Railway

Express and passenger trains run between Rameswaram and Coimbatore, Bhubaneshwar, Tirupati, Chennai Egmore, Okha, Kanyakumari and Varnasi via Paramakudi, and all trains stop here. Manamadurai is a nearby junction.

Road

Regular bus services are available to all important cities of Tamil Nadu from this town as it lies in the centre of the Madurai-Rameswaram road which is part of new Kochi-Dhanushkodi National Highway (NH 49 (AH 43))

Constituency 

Assembly constituency: Paramakudi(Reserved for SC) https://en.m.wikipedia.org/wiki/Paramakudi_Assembly_constituency

Parliamentary constituency:

Ramanathapuram (Lok Sabha constituency)

Places of interest 

Rameswaram: The main pilgrimage  centre in Ramanthapuram District. Also a tourist spot 90 km from Paramakudi. A large and beautiful Sivan temple with 21 puniya theerthams. Adi 18 is an important day for this temple. Many foreigners and North Indians visit to worship this god throughout the year. Special  poojas are performed on important days. This temple attracts many pilgrims from all over India.

Sethukarai: an important place for pilgrims situated 60 km from Paramakudi. People say that in the epic Ramayanam, Lord Rama went to Sri Lanka from Sethukarai by a bridge made up of stones. In this place, people worship their ancestors.

Thiruvadanai: Has an ancient and famous Vishnu temple, 90 km from Paramakudi. People worship this god in festival seasons.

Thiruppullani: 60 km from Paramakudi, has an ancient Sivan temple which is very popular with nearby villages.

Devipattinam: Has a Navagiraha temple 60 km from Paramakudi. This temple is in the sea, and people worship throughout the year. 

Uthirakosa: 35 km from Paramakudi, has an ancient Nataraja temple with a Lord Natarajar statue made of “Green Maragatha stone.” People worship this god at “Arudhra Dharsan”, in December and January of every year.

Nainarkoil: 15 km from Paramakudi, has an ancient Sivan and Amman temple. People worship at this amman in the Adi festival.

Ervadi Tharh: 70 km from Paramakudi. Has a very old mosque. In January the Santahana Koodu festival is celebrated at the pilgrims centre.

Constituency
 Paramakudi (state assembly constituency)
 Ramanathapuram (Lok Sabha constituency)

Demographics
According to the 2011 census, Paramakudi had a population of 95,579 with a sex ratio of 966 females for every 1,000 males, much above the national average of 929. 9,292 were under the age of six, constituting 4,800 males and 4,492 females. Scheduled Castes and Scheduled Tribes accounted for 14.5% and 0.08% of the population respectively. The average literacy of the town was 81.44%, compared to the national average of 72.99%. The town had  23,504 households. There were 35,561 workers, comprising 825 cultivators, 881 main agricultural labourers, 6,682 in household industries, 23,453 other workers, 3,720 marginal workers, 113 marginal cultivators, 209 marginal agricultural labourers, 496 marginal workers in household industries and 2,902 other marginal workers.

According to the religious census of 2011, Paramakudi had 86.55% Hindus, 9.2% Muslims, 4.11% Christians, 0.01% Sikhs and 0.12% following other religions.

References

External links
 Paramakudi Municipality

Cities and towns in Ramanathapuram district